The Old Uyghur alphabet was a Turkic script used for writing the Old Uyghur, a variety of Old Turkic spoken in Turpan and Gansu that is the ancestor of the modern Western Yugur language. The term "Old Uyghur" used for this alphabet is misleading because Qocho, the Uyghur (Yugur) kingdom created in 843, originally used the Old Turkic alphabet.  The Uyghur adopted this "Old Uyghur" script from local inhabitants when they migrated into Turfan after 840.  It was an adaptation of the Aramaic alphabet used for texts with Buddhist, Manichaean and Christian content for 700–800 years in Turpan. The last known manuscripts are dated to the 18th century. This was the prototype for the Mongolian and Manchu alphabets. The Old Uyghur alphabet was brought to Mongolia by Tata-tonga.

The Old Uyghur script was used between the 8th and 17th centuries primarily in the Tarim Basin of Central Asia, located in present-day Xinjiang Uygur Autonomous Region, China. It is a cursive-joining alphabet with features of an abjad and
is written vertically. The script flourished through the 15th century in Central Asia and parts of Iran, but it was eventually replaced by the Arabic script in the 16th century. Its usage was continued in Gansu through the 17th century.

Like the Sogdian alphabet (technically, an abjad), the Old Uyghur tended to use matres lectionis for the long vowels as well as for the short ones. The practice of leaving short vowels unrepresented was almost completely abandoned. Thus, while ultimately deriving from a Semitic abjad, the Old Uyghur alphabet can be said to have been largely "alphabetized".

Gallery

Unicode

The Old Uyghur alphabet was added to the Unicode Standard in September, 2021 with the release of version 14.0.

The Unicode block for Old Uyghur is U+10F70–U+10FAF:

See also
Western Yugur language

References

Citations

Sources

External links 

Latin to Old Uyghur transliteration
Old Uyghur Alphabet on Omniglot
Old Uyghur alphabet and Orkhon Turkic alphabet

History of the Turkic peoples
Obsolete writing systems